Prudence and the Pill is a 1968 British comedy film made by Twentieth Century-Fox. It was directed by Fielder Cook and Ronald Neame and produced by Kenneth Harper and Ronald J. Kahn from a screenplay by Hugh Mills, based on his 1965 novel. The music score was by Bernard Ebbinghouse and the cinematography by Ted Moore.

The film stars Deborah Kerr and David Niven with Robert Coote, Irina Demick, Joyce Redman, Judy Geeson, Keith Michell, Michael Hordern and Edith Evans.

Hayley Mills was originally announced for the part eventually filled by Geeson. Mills had previously co-starred with Kerr and Evans in The Chalk Garden (1964), which was also directed by Neame.

Plot 
The film portrays the conflicting and comical attempts by five couples to avoid pregnancy by using contraceptive pills. All of their efforts are ultimately unsuccessful, with the result that all five of the women give birth the following year.

The story revolves around a wealthy London banker named Gerald Hardcastle (Niven) and his wife Prudence (Kerr), who live together unhappily, sleeping in separate bedrooms and speaking to each other only when necessary. The five couples in the film are (1) Gerald and his French mistress Elizabeth, or "Liz" (Demick), (2) Prudence and her doctor, Dr. Alan Huart (Michell), (3) the Hardcastles's maid Rose (Turner) and their chauffeur Ted (Armstrong), (4) Gerald's brother Henry (Coote) and his wife Grace (Redman), and (5) Henry and Grace's daughter Geraldine (Geeson) and her beau Tony Bates (Dundas).

All of the couples want to use a birth control pill called "Thenol", but none of them wants to admit it. Prudence, Grace, and Ted manage to acquire supplies of pills, Grace through a prescription written by Huart, and Ted from the
local chemist, or pharmacist, who happens to be a friend of his. However, Grace soon becomes pregnant, because Geraldine has been stealing her pills and replacing them with aspirin tablets. After Geraldine admits her pill-switching scheme to Grace and Grace tells Gerald about it, Gerald uses the scheme on Prudence to generate incriminating evidence of her affair.

Meanwhile, believing that Rose is too conservative to accept contraception, Ted puts his tablets in a vitamin bottle and tells her she needs them for her health. However, Rose is worried about becoming pregnant, so she switches the pills in her vitamin bottle with the pills in Prudence's Thenol bottle, just moments after Gerald replaces Prudence's Thenol with aspirin. The result, then, is that Rose unwittingly trades Ted's Thenol for Gerald's aspirin. She soon becomes pregnant, and Ted tells Gerald about the pills he gave her, but says nothing about telling her they were vitamins. When Gerald asks her why her Thenol pills failed to work, she asks him how he knew about them, thinking that he has already found out about her taking Prudence's pills, at which point they both realise that she has revealed her guilt.

Now knowing why Prudence is still not pregnant, Gerald buys more aspirin, determined to expose her relationship with Huart. This eventually works, as do whatever measures Grace took to keep her pills away from Geraldine. By the end of the film, Geraldine and Prudence are both expecting.

Eventually, Gerald gets into trouble with both Liz and Prudence. Liz grows dissatisfied in her covert relationship with Gerald, who has been hiding her from his family, and decides to leave him. Prudence finds the letter that Liz wrote to Gerald about her decision, and Gerald finds Huart's Thenol prescription for Prudence. At first, neither Gerald nor Prudence is willing to grant the other a divorce, but Prudence offers to take the blame after becoming pregnant, as long as Gerald will spare Huart's reputation. Gerald accepts this arrangement grudgingly, but before meeting with Huart, he happens to see Liz while driving through town, and she tells him she is going to have his baby. Now able to see her openly, and with a child on the way, Gerald quickly and enthusiastically agrees to an amicable divorce. A few months later, a total of six newborn babies arrive, Rose having had twins.

Cast

Reception
According to Fox records the film required $6,425,000 in rentals to break even and by 11 December 1970 had made $7,175,000. In September 1970 Fox reported it had made a profit on the film of $513,000.

References

External links 
 
 
 
 

1968 films
1968 romantic comedy films
20th Century Fox films
Birth control
British romantic comedy films
1960s English-language films
Films based on British novels
Films directed by Fielder Cook
Films directed by Ronald Neame
Films set in London
Films shot at Pinewood Studios
British pregnancy films
1960s pregnancy films
1960s British films